Toxicological Sciences is a monthly peer-reviewed scientific journal which covers all aspects of research on toxicology. It is published by Oxford University Press on behalf of the Society of Toxicology. It was established in 1981 as Fundamental and Applied Toxicology and obtained its current name in 1998. The current editor-in-chief is Jeffrey M. Peters, a professor of molecular toxicology and carcinogenesis at The Pennsylvania State University, and the Managing Editor is Virginia F. Hawkins.  The editorial staff also includes Associate Editors in subject areas and an editorial board of topic experts. While its ISO 4 abbreviation is Toxicol. Sci. it is commonly referred to as ToxSci.

Abstracting and indexing 
The journal is abstracted and indexed in Biological Abstracts, BIOSIS, CAB International, Chemical Abstracts Service, Current Contents, EMBASE, Health & Safety Science Abstracts, Science Citation Index, and Toxicology Abstracts.

According to the Journal Citation Reports, the journal has a 2016 impact factor of 4.081, ranking it 11th out of 92 journals in the category "Toxicology".

References

External links
 

Monthly journals
Toxicology journals
Oxford University Press academic journals
English-language journals
Publications established in 1981
Hybrid open access journals